"Devil Woman" is a 1976 single by British singer Cliff Richard from his album I'm Nearly Famous.

A worldwide hit on its original release, the song saw a resurgence in popularity after appearing in the film I, Tonya (2017), as the theme for the character of LaVona Golden, played by Allison Janney.

The song was written by Terry Britten and Christine Authors (who was the singer of the Family Dogg under the name Christine Holmes). The song is told from the point of view of a man jinxed from an encounter with a stray cat with evil eyes, and his discovery that the psychic medium (a Gypsy) whose help he sought to break the curse was the one responsible for the curse in the first place. However, the nature of the curse is not made clear.

Original release
Released in late April 1976, "Devil Woman" rose to number 9 on the singles chart in Richard's native UK in June 1976. It became Richard's first single to reach the Top 20 in the US, making number 6 on the Hot 100, Richard's highest peaking single and biggest seller in the US. "Devil Woman" is the third biggest-selling Cliff Richard single, with over two million copies sold worldwide. It was certified Gold by the RIAA in the US and the CRIA in Canada.

The musicians featured on the recording are Terry Britten on guitar, Alan Tarney on bass, Clem Cattini on drums, Graham Todd on keyboards, and Tony Rivers, John Perry, and Ken Gold on backing vocals, with string arrangements by Richard Hewson. The song is heavily guitar-driven, with soft-distortion lines doubling the melody in the chorus and long, high, sustained single notes providing atmosphere over the verses. A Rhodes electric piano, bass guitar, drums, and percussion are the only other instruments.

Track listing 
7": EMI / EMI 2458
 "Devil Woman" – 3:41
 "Love On (Shine On) – 3:04

7": Rocket / PIG-40574 (North America)
 "Devil Woman" – 3:35
 "Love On (Shine On) – 3:04

Personnel 
 Cliff Richard – vocals
 Terry Britten – guitar
 Alan Tarney – bass guitar
 Graham Todd – electric piano
 Clem Cattini – drums
 Tony Rivers – backing vocals
 John Perry – backing vocals
 Ken Gold – backing vocals

Chart performance and certifications

Weekly charts

Year-end charts

Certifications

References

External links
In-depth Song Analysis at the Cliff Richard Song Database
 

1976 singles
Cliff Richard songs
Songs written by Terry Britten
1976 songs
EMI Records singles
The Rocket Record Company singles
MCA Records singles
Number-one singles in South Africa